Cora is an unincorporated community in Lewis County, in the U.S. state of Washington. It is located off U.S. Route 12, next to the Cowlitz River between the towns of Randle and Packwood.

History
Cora was established in 1888 by Levi A. Davis, son of the founder of Claquato, and named after Cora Ferguson, Davis' niece. A post office was established at Cora in 1890, and remained in operation until 1907/1908.

References

Populated places in Lewis County, Washington
Unincorporated communities in Lewis County, Washington
Unincorporated communities in Washington (state)